Anabarilius polylepis is a species of ray-finned fish in the family Cyprinidae, that is endemic to Yunnan, China. It only occurs in Dian Lake and Songhuaba reservoir in Kunming. It was once a major commercial fish species, but it has not been confirmed in the lake since the 1970s. Its decline is attributed to many factors: introduced fish species, decreasing water quality, the loss of macrophytes (partly caused by the introduced grass carp), over-fishing, and the loss of breeding sites due to siltation and blocked access.

Anabarilius polylepis grows to  standard length. It lives in the uppermost ten metres of the water column and feeds mainly on aquatic insects, plankton, and plant fragments.

References

Anabarilius
Cyprinid fish of Asia
Freshwater fish of China
Endemic fauna of Yunnan
Fish described in 1904
Taxonomy articles created by Polbot
 01